Canal 11 is a private Costa Rican television channel, owned and operated by Repretel since 1996. It was the first station owned and operated by Repretel-Albavision group in Costa Rica.

History
Repretel bought the station from rival Teletica, due to a mismanagement from the leasing company operating the station, forcing the sale; Repretel was growing fast, leasing Channel 9 and 6; became the first TV-station owned and operated in Costa Rica.

In 1996, the channel briefly relayed channel 6. On March 1, 1997, the channel became independent again, airing a schedule consisting primarily of imported cartoons and telenovelas. On June 9, 2003, the channel interchanged schedules with Repretel 4 and changed focus to Latin American entertainment, including news and variety shows from Telemundo and Univisión.

Programming

Channel 11 is the second most watched channel on the network, behind Repretel 6, its programming consists of productions by Televisa, Univisión and its own productions.

References

External links
 Official website

Television stations in Costa Rica
Spanish-language television stations
Television channels and stations established in 1969